Group B of the 2014 FIBA Basketball World Cup was the group stage of the 2014 FIBA Basketball World Cup for the , , , ,  and . Each team played each other once, for a total of five games per team, with all games played at Palacio Municipal de Deportes San Pablo, Seville. After all of the games were played, the four teams with the best records qualified for the final round.

Teams

Standings

All times are local UTC+2.

30 August

Croatia vs. Philippines
This was the first competitive game between Croatia and the Philippines.

Puerto Rico vs. Argentina
This was the second meeting between Puerto Rico and Argentina in the World Cup. Puerto Rico won the first meeting in the 1990 FIBA World Championship. In their last competitive game against each other, Puerto Rico defeated Argentina in the 2013 FIBA Americas Championship.

Greece vs. Senegal
This was the second meeting between Greece and Senegal in the World Cup. Greece won the first meeting in the 1998 FIBA World Championship.

31 August

Argentina vs. Croatia
This was the first meeting between Argentina and the Croatia in the World Cup. The two teams previously met in the Summer Olympics, Argentina won in the 2008 Olympics, while Croatia won in 1996.

Senegal vs. Puerto Rico
This was the third meeting between Senegal and Puerto Rico in the World Cup. Puerto Rico won the first two games, including their last match-up in the 2006 FIBA World Championship.

Philippines vs. Greece
This was the first competitive game between the Philippines and Greece.

1 September

Croatia vs. Senegal
This was the first meeting between Croatia and Senegal.

Argentina vs. Philippines
This was the second meeting between Argentina and the Philippines in the World Cup. Argentina won the first meeting in the 1974 FIBA World Championship.

Puerto Rico vs. Greece
This was the second meeting between Puerto Rico and Greece in the World Cup. Greece won the two games, including their latest match-up in the 2010 FIBA World Championship.

3 September

Philippines vs. Puerto Rico
This was the fourth meeting between the Philippines and Puerto Rico in the World Cup. Puerto Rico won the first meeting in the 1959 FIBA World Championship. In their last competitive game, the Puerto Ricans defeated the Filipinos at the 1972 Olympics.

Senegal vs. Argentina
This was the first competitive game between Senegal and Argentina.

Greece vs. Croatia
This was the third meeting between Greece and Croatia in the World Cup. Croatia won the first two meetings, all in the 1994 FIBA World Championship. Croatia won in the FIBA EuroBasket 2013 in their last competitive game against each other.

4 September

Senegal vs. Philippines
This was the first meeting between Senegal and the Philippines in the World Cup. The Philippines has previously met Senegal twice in the Olympics, winning both games, including their last match-up at the 1972 Olympics.

Croatia vs. Puerto Rico
This was the first meeting between Croatia and Puerto Rico in the World Cup.  The two countries previously played at the 2008 Summer Olympic Qualifying Tournament won by Croatia.

Argentina vs. Greece
This was the third meeting between Argentina and Greece in the World Cup. Greece won the first two meetings, including their last match-up at the 1990 FIBA World Championship. Argentina won the last competitive game against Greece at the 2008 Olympics.

External links
 
 

Group B
2014–15 in Greek basketball
2014–15 in Croatian basketball
2014–15 in Argentine basketball
2014 in Senegalese sport
2014 in Puerto Rican sports
Philippines at the 2014 FIBA Basketball World Cup